Boris Buneev (1921-2015) was a Soviet film director. He was awarded the title of Merited Artist of the Russian Federation in 1973, and won the USSR State Prize in 1974 for the film "The Last Meeting".

Biography 
Boris Buneev graduated from the directing department of VGIK in 1944, as part of Sergey Eisenstein's masterclass.

In 1944-1949, he was a director at Mosfilm, and then in 1949-1951 and 1952-2005, at the Gorky Film Studio. His first film was Glorious Path (1949).

Selected filmography 

 1949 - Glorious Path
 1951 - On the Steppe
 1953 - Mysterious Discovery
 1956 - For the Power of the Soviets
 1959 - The Man from Planet Earth
 1962 - The Ends of the Earth
 1971 - Khutorok v stepi
 1974 - The Last Meeting
 1976 - Duck Village. A Tale.
 1979 - The Evil Spirit of Yambuy
 1987 - Silnee vsekh inykh veleniy

External links 
 https://www.imdb.com/name/nm0120439/?ref_=tt_ov_dr
 https://www.kinopoisk.ru/name/301212/

References 

1921 births
2015 deaths
Gerasimov Institute of Cinematography alumni
Soviet film directors